XHVLO-FM is a radio station on 101.5 FM in Guanajuato City, Guanajuato. XHVLO is owned by Grupo Audiorama Comunicaciones and carries an oldies format known as Love FM.

History
XHVLO received its concession on November 26, 1980. It was owned by Doris Laura Jiménez Díaz.

In April 2018, operation of the station transferred to Grupo Audiorama Comunicaciones from Radiorama Bajío, resulting in the replacement of the "Tu Recuerdo" oldies format with a relaunched romantic format as Love FM.

References

Radio stations in Guanajuato
Radio stations established in 1980